Hilgay is a village and civil parish in Norfolk, England,  from Downham Market.
For local government purposes, it falls within the district of King's Lynn and West Norfolk.

Other places nearby are Fordham, Ryston, Southery and Denver.

History

The name Hilgay is derived from the Old English to mean 'island or dry ground in a marsh, of the followers of a man called Hytha or Hydla during Anglo Saxon times.
Modney Priory built here by the monks of Ramsey Abbey was a Benedictine cell.
Its elevation has become more pronounced as the draining of the fenland has caused the ground to shrink. It was notable in Saxon and early Norman times for the large numbers of fish and eels found there. Hilgay Old Bridge still crosses the river, but the newer A10 road bypass crosses just below it.

The scholar and poet Phineas Fletcher (1580 -1650) became chaplain to Sir Henry Willoughby, who presented him in 1621 to the rectory of Hilgay, Norfolk, where he married and spent the rest of his life.

Captain George William Manby, who lived for much of his life in Hilgay, is buried in the churchyard, and his memorial celebrates his invention of the Manby mortar to send a line to ships in distress.  He was awarded £2,000 by Parliament, as use of the device had saved 230 lives by 1823.

A Hilgay village sign was erected in 1987.
The musical instruments on it are displayed in honour of Hilgay Silver Band, it was still going strong over 100 years after its formation around 1896. Its original members were agricultural workers from the local area. A Manby mortar is also represented.
The bridge depicted between the two instruments is Hilgay Old Bridge. The bridge was built in 1899 to transport traffic from the centre of the village over the River Wissey to the north. Within sight of the bridge, one hundred yards or so to the west, the A10 Hilgay bypass bridge now carries the majority of vehicles across the water.
A small plaque attached to the bottom of the supporting post states the village sign was 'Erected by Hilgay Parish Council 1987'.

In 2018 nine one-metre square test pits were dug as part of an archaeological investigation. The report was published in 2019. 

Hilgay Parish Council are responsible for the local allotments, cemetery and defibrillator.
There was once a Hilgay railway station on the Fen Line.

Governance
Hilgay is part of the electoral ward of Hilgay with Denver. The population of this ward at the 2011 Census was 2,409.

References

Bibliography

External links 

GENUKI(tm) page

Villages in Norfolk
Civil parishes in Norfolk
King's Lynn and West Norfolk